Terebra fijiensis is a species of sea snail, a marine gastropod mollusc in the family Terebridae, the auger snails.

Description
The length of the shell varies between 20 mm and 45 mm.

Distribution
This marine species occurs off the Philippines and the Fiji Islands.

References

 Bratcher T. & Cernohorsky W.O. (1987). Living terebras of the world. A monograph of the recent Terebridae of the world. American Malacologists, Melbourne, Florida & Burlington, Massachusetts. 240pp
 Terryn Y. (2007). Terebridae: A Collectors Guide. Conchbooks & NaturalArt. 59pp + plates.

External links
 Gastropods.com: Terebra (Textilis-group) fijiensis

Terebridae
Gastropods described in 1873